Samantha Stosur and Scott Draper defeated Liezel Huber and Kevin Ullyett in the final 6–2, 2–6, [10–6] to win the mixed doubles title at the 2005 Australian Open. This was the first Grand Slam title for both Stosur and Draper, and would be Draper's only Grand Slam title.

Elena Bovina and Nenad Zimonjić were the defending champions, but Bovina did not compete due to a left foot injury. Zimonjić participated with Elena Likhovtseva, and the pair lost in the second round to Stosur and Draper.

Seeds

Draw

Finals

Top half

Bottom half

External links
WTA Draw
 2005 Australian Open – Doubles draws and results at the International Tennis Federation

Australian Open - Mixed Doubles
Mixed doubles
Australian Open (tennis) by year – Mixed doubles